Clara Mochi (born 29 April 1956) is an Italian fencer. She competed in the women's team foil events at the 1980 and 1984 Summer Olympics.

References

1956 births
Living people
Italian female fencers
Olympic fencers of Italy
Fencers at the 1980 Summer Olympics
Fencers at the 1984 Summer Olympics
Fencers from Milan